The 2018–19 Detroit Red Wings season was the 93rd season for the National Hockey League (NHL) franchise that was established on September 25, 1926. It was also the Red Wings' second season at Little Caesars Arena. The team was eliminated from playoff contention on March 12, 2019, and missed the playoffs for the third year in a row.

Off-season
On June 22, the Red Wings hired Dan Bylsma as an assistant coach.

Standings

Schedule and results

Preseason

Regular season

Player statistics

Skaters

Goaltenders

†Denotes player spent time with another team before joining the Red Wings. Stats reflect time with the Red Wings only.
‡Denotes player was traded mid-season. Stats reflect time with the Red Wings only.
Bold/italics denotes franchise record.

Awards and honours

Awards

Milestones

Records
On April 2, Tyler Bertuzzi recorded two goals and one assist in a 4–1 victory over the Pittsburgh Penguins. He became the first player in Red Wings franchise history to record four consecutive three-point games.

Suspensions/fines

Transactions
The Red Wings have been involved in the following transactions during the 2018–19 season.

Trades

Free agents

Waivers

Contract terminations

Retirement

Signings

Draft picks

Below are the Detroit Red Wings' selections at the 2018 NHL Entry Draft, which was held on June 22 and 23, 2018, at the American Airlines Center in Dallas, Texas.

Notes:
 The Vegas Golden Knights' first-round pick went to the Detroit Red Wings as the result of a trade on February 26, 2018, that sent Tomas Tatar to Vegas in exchange for the Islanders' second-round pick in 2019, a third-round pick in 2021 and this pick.
 The Ottawa Senators' second-round pick went to the Detroit Red Wings as the result of a trade on February 28, 2017, that sent Brendan Smith to the New York Rangers in exchange for a third-round pick in 2017 and this pick.
 The Philadelphia Flyers' third-round pick went to the Detroit Red Wings as the result of a trade on February 19, 2018, that sent Petr Mrazek to Philadelphia in exchange for a conditional third-round pick in 2019 and this pick (being conditional at the time of the trade).
 The Pittsburgh Penguins' third-round pick went to the Detroit Red Wings as the result of a trade on October 21, 2017, that sent Riley Sheahan and a fifth-round pick in 2018 to Pittsburgh in exchange for Scott Wilson and this pick.
 The Montreal Canadiens' sixth-round pick went to the Columbus Blue Jackets as the result of a trade on June 23, 2018, that sent a fifth-round pick in 2019 to Detroit in exchange for this pick. The Red Wings acquired this pick as the result of a trade on February 28, 2017, that sent Steve Ott to Montreal.

References

Detroit Red Wings seasons
Detroit Red Wings
Detroit Red Wings
Detroit Red Wings